Lampell is a surname. Notable people with the surname include:

 Millard Lampell (1919–1997), American screenwriter
 Sven Lampell (1920–2007), Swedish Air Force officer

See also
 Lampela
 Lamprell